The Panic and Agoraphobia Scale (PAS) is a rating scale developed for measuring severity of agoraphobia with or without panic attacks.



Background 
The Panic and Agoraphobia Scale (PAS) is primarily used for monitoring the efficacy of both medication and psychotherapy treatments of agoraphobia, as well as a screening tool for the disorder. It is available in both self-rated and clinician-rated versions and the scale structure is compatible with DSM-IV and ICD-10 classifications.

Translations
In addition to the English version, translations are available in many languages, including French, German, Greek, Hebrew, Italian, Yiddish, Chinese, Thai, and others.

Scoring 
The total of the score of scale indicates the severity of the disorder. The PAS contains 13 questions (items) based on a five-point Likert scale (0 to 4). Two or three items contribute each of five subscales, which cover the spectrum of agoraphobia symptom clusters:
 panic attacks
 agoraphobic avoidance
 anticipatory anxiety
 disability
 worries about health

Efficacy 
The Panic and Agoraphobia Scale has been shown to be an effective instrument for measuring the severity of agoraphobia and panic attacks, as well as monitoring treatment results.

See also 
 Panic Disorder Severity Scale
 List of diagnostic classification and rating scales used in psychiatry

References

External links 
 Online version of the PAS

Anxiety screening and assessment tools